The 2019 season was Kedah's 11th season in the Malaysia Super League since its inception in 2004. The season covers the period from 1 February to 21 July 2019.

Management team

Players

Transfers and contracts

In

Out

Loans out

Extension of contract

Friendlies

Pre Friendlies

Tour of Krabi

Mid season Friendlies

Competitions

Malaysia Super League

League table

Results by matchday

Fixtures and results

Malaysia FA Cup

Kedah won 4−2 on aggregate.

Kedah won 3–3 on away goal rule.

Malaysia Cup

Group stage

Quarter-final

Kedah won 6−2 on aggregate.

Semi-final

Final

Statistics

Appearances and goals

Statistics accurate as of 17 December 2019.

References 

Kedah Darul Aman F.C.
Kedah Darul Aman F.C. seasons
Malaysian football clubs 2019 season